Frederick Couture Glick (born February 25, 1937) is an American former gridiron football player and coach.  Glick played as a safety in the National Football League (NFL) for the Chicago/St. Louis Cardinals and the Houston Oilers. Glick attended Colorado State, where he largely played as a quarterback as well as defensive back. He was inducted into the Colorado State University Athletics Hall of Fame in 1991.

Glick played for the Cardinals franchise in 1959, when the team was in Chicago, and following year when the team relocated to St. Louis.  He went on to play six seasons in the American Football League (AFL), starting with the Houston Oilers in 1961, when the team won their second consecutive AFL Championship.  Glick was an AFL All-Star in 1962, 1963, and 1964. In a 1962 game against the Buffalo Bills, he was credited with 27 tackles, which may be an AFL single game record. In 1963, he set an AFL single season record with 12 interceptions. In 1965 Fred was elected along with George Blanda as Co Captains of the Houston Oilers. In 2009, Glick was voted by the fans as the starting Safety on the "All-Time Houston Oilers Dream Team".

Glick began his coaching career after back surgery forced an early retirement from football at the age of 28. His first job was Defensive Backfield coach at New Mexico State University in 1967. The following year Glick was hired as Defensive Backfield coach at the University of Arizona where he coached through the 1972 season before being hired by Frank Kush at Arizona State University. After the 1977 season Glick began his professional coaching career being hired by the legendary Bud Wilkinson to join his staff with the St Louis Cardinals followed by stops with the New York Giants and the New Orleans Saints before moving on to the Winnipeg Blue Bombers and Ottawa Roughriders of the Canadian Football League. While with the Giants, Glick teamed with Bill Belichick and Bill Parcells as defensive coaches leading Giants and Rookie sensation Lawrence Taylor to playoff win over Philadelphia Eagles before falling to Joe Montana led San Francisco 49ers.
Glick was head coach for the Ottawa Rough Riders of the Canadian Football League (CFL) from 1987 to 1988.  He played college football at Colorado State University

See also
 List of American Football League players

References

1937 births
Living people
American football quarterbacks
American football safeties
Chicago Cardinals players
Colorado State Rams football players
Houston Oilers players
New Orleans Saints coaches
New York Giants coaches
Ottawa Rough Riders coaches
St. Louis Cardinals (football) players
Winnipeg Blue Bombers coaches
American Football League All-Star players
Sportspeople from Aurora, Colorado
Players of American football from Colorado
American Football League players